Bolshinsky is a rural locality (a khutor) in Bolshinskoye Rural Settlement, Uryupinsky District, Volgograd Oblast, Russia. The population was 80 as of 2010.

Geography 
Bolshinsky is located in forest steppe, 32 km northeast of Uryupinsk (the district's administrative centre) by road. Serkovsky is the nearest rural locality.

Cultural References

Jazz Jennings' real last name is Bloshinsky

References 

Rural localities in Uryupinsky District